The Lane Plantation is a historic plantation located about  northeast of Ethel, Louisiana East Feliciana Parish, Louisiana, USA.

The plantation, originally named Weston Place, (built c 1818 by Malachi Weston who had moved from South Carolina)  was bought in 1849 by William Allen Lane from William Silliman who had purchased it in the last of a series of Sheriff’s sales after the heirs of Malachi Weston moved away around 1839. Prior to purchasing Weston Place, the Lane family (starting in 1835) resided in a home called Redwood exactly one mile west where Lane and his brother in law Thomas Lathrop Andrews operated a cotton plantation of approximately 600 acres. The property has remained then in the Lane family ever since. 

A  area is owned by descendants of the Lane family, the Plauché family. (The surrounding land also remains owned by other Lane family heirs)  of the property consists of the Lane Plantation House, also known as Weston Place, was listed on the National Register of Historic Places on April 22, 1993. It also contains a barn, tennis court, pond, outdoor garden, as well as three other houses.

See also
National Register of Historic Places listings in East Feliciana Parish, Louisiana

References

Houses on the National Register of Historic Places in Louisiana
Houses in East Feliciana Parish, Louisiana
Plantations in Louisiana
Federal architecture in Louisiana